Alexandru Darida (born May 15, 1955) is an artist known for his pioneering social activist art. His work includes oil paintings, drawings, and acrylic sculpture that speak to such diverse subjects as the promotion of stem cell research and the politically charged relationship of man with nature.

Early life and education

Born to an Italian father and Romanian mother, Darida grew up in the city of Satu Mare.
After graduating from the Ecole des Beaux Arts in Romania, in 1978, Darida struggled with the restraints on creative freedom imposed by the communist regime. In 1985, Darida left Romania for Italy and enrolled for studies at the Benedetti Liberal Academy of Art in Rome.  In 1987, Darida sought the help of Clelio Darida (no relation), undersecretary of the Minister of the Interior, former Mayor of Rome as he was still being harassed by the Romanian government.  Darida immigrated to the United States that year, where he continued his studies at the American Academy of Art in Chicago.

Artistic style and reviews

Darida's style is associated with chiaroscuro a technique that uses strong contrasts between light and dark.  Many of Darida's works feature, or are applied to musical instruments and/or incorporate natural and man made objects as part of the "Vibrant Expression" style.  For his sculpture, he works in the medium of acrylic, and his forms are influenced by the Romanian sculptor Constantin Brâncuși (1876-1957),. Darida's sculptures use the transparency of acrylic to create layers of thin glazes, echoing the technique that he applies in his paintings. 

Darida tackles controversial issues such as stem cell research, renewable green energy sources, man's place in relation to nature, and music related to the cosmic forces.  He explains that color, or absence of color, as well as the shape and meaning of his work have roots in a certain universal energy.

Claudia Moscovici wrote: Darida considers art to be "the soul of the people" and feels that "if you touch people's hearts then that art will stay forever". "Darida's women are allegorical phantasms that populate our childhood fantasies and dreams.  His application of paint is both delicate and rough; soft plays of light and shadow highlight the luminosity of gold.  At the same time, the vitality of heavy, swirling paint applied with a palette knife endow his paintings with a modern feel."

Sarah Seamark, Editor in Chief of Art World wrote: "Darida utilizes found objects that merge elements of abstract and sculptural forms that represents a reconciliation with self and our surroundings. Their use, in combination with Darida's classic painting technique, is designed to create a distinguished, forward-looking style."

Awards and recognition

Darida's museum placements include the Powerhouse Museum and the Sydney Opera House in Sydney, Australia, and his work had been featured at Municipal Galleries across Romania, in the Smithsonian Museum in Washington DC, and the Illinois State Museum.  He is the recipient of awards including the Formello-Roma International Prize for Painting   and the Award for Excellence in the Multimedia Miniatures Show in Romania.  Alexandru is heavily involved with music and paints to music. Darida often finds inspiration in the voice of his wife who is an opera singer.

Awards, charities and affiliations

 President's Award American Electrology Association, 2012 
 Holiday Fundraiser for Romanian Cultural Exchange, 2012
 Award of Excellence, City of Chicago, 2010
 The Art of Human Rights, benefiting Heartland Alliance, 2010
 Chicago Symphony Orchestra Bridges between Art & Music - benefiting CSO's outreach programs targeting all segments of the Chicago community. Ref: "Painted Violins: Bridges Between Art & Music" by Lori Dana, 2010
 Benefit night for Cystic Fibrosis Scholarship Foundation, 2009
 Misericordia Heart of Mercy, Chicago, provides a continuum of care and network of services for people with developmental disabilities.  Darida worked as a teacher, helping children to prepare an art show where their artworks were auctioned as a fundraiser, 2008
 Art against Aids - Heartland Alliance, 2008 
 Sotheby's Legends of our Time Art Show and Auction benefiting The Rett Syndrome Research Foundation, 2001

Commissions

 Portrait of Mircea Eliade, Romanian historian of religion, fiction writer, philosopher, and professor at the University of Chicago.  Commissioned by Chicago University in collaboration with George Predescu, Romanian Consul General in Chicago, 2009
 Benefit night for Cystic Fibrosis Scholarship Foundation, 2009
 Portrait of Nicolae Titulescu, well-known Romanian diplomat and Minister of Foreign Affairs for Romania 1927-1928, commissioned by Dr. Eliot Sorel director of the SiMARC Foundation and professor at George Washington University, 1999

National and international publications, reviews and articles

 National Register's Who's Who | Library of Congress | 
 Watch Alex Darida la TVRi | RTN Chicago Episodes | Blip, May 2012
 www.Clipa.com/Darida. "Pictura Lui Darida." Key words: Clipa.com/ artist Darida 
 "Occidentul Romanesc -Alexandru Darida" May 22, 2011 Review - Art Show Chicago.  Magazine in Romanian language edited in Spain.
 Romania USA Gandacul de Colorado Alexandru Darida - Review for the City Hall Chicago Art Show April 20, 2010
 Romania Libera, March 20, 2010 review: Alexandru Darida City Hall Chicago Exhibition
 Romanticism and Postromanticism by Claudia Moscovici, Lexington books, hardcover 2007, paperback 2010 - " The Iconic Art of Alexandru Darida"
 Art World News, September 2009 - "Darida, Pioneer and Social Activist," article by Sarah Seamark, Editor in Chief
 Art Business News, January 2009 - "Artist Rides the Green Wave," article by Gabriel Kiley
 Romanian Tribune, July 11, 2008 - Review of the art of Alexandru Darida in relation to nature
 Art World News, May 2008 -  "Darida's Work a Catalyst to Preserve Nature," article by 
 Sarah Seamark, Editor in Chief 
 Alexandru Darida's artwork appears in "Wurzeln im Licht  Sathmar  2006 -Helmut Berner "  Zeitgenossische Rumanische Lyrik Antologie de poezie Romaneasca- Radacini in Lumina This is a bilingual Romanian -German  Anthology of  Romanian poetry. The book is illustrated with art of Romanian artists from all over the world
  Arbus, December 2006, North Florida's Arts & Business magazine - "Painter Alexandru Darida - Venetian Dreams," review by Madelaine Peck
 Art World News, July 2005 - " Darida's Painted Musical Sculptures." Key words: Darida's musical sculptures. www.shareholder.com 
 Art World News, May 2001, Artist Vitae - "Alexandru Darida: The Pursuit of Artistic Freedom," article by Joelle Blaskey
 America- Newspaper September 1999, "Powerful Call to Fight Breast Cancer," article by Mariana Cuceu MD.

Selected exhibitions

 2012- Shanghai Art Fair
 2011- Illinois State Museum, Southern Illinois Art & Artisans Center, Whittington IL
 2010- City Hall of Chicago
 2010- River East Art Center, Chicago
 2010- Dali-Lamb Museum, Chicago
 2009- The Peggy Notebaert Nature Museum, Chicago
 2009- REpose Gallery, Chicago, "Global Consciousness"
 2007- International Artexpo New York
 2006- International Artexpo New York
 2005- Mozart Gallery, Chicago, "Celebration of Music"
 2003- Fine Art Forum, Metropolitan Pavilion, Chelsea District of New York City
 2002- International Artexpo New York
 2001- International Artexpo New York
 2000- International Artexpo Las Vegas
 1999- Smithsonian Folklife Festival Art Show, Washington, DC

References

External links
 Official website
 Masterpiece Publishing

Romanian painters
20th-century American painters
American male painters
21st-century American painters
Romanian emigrants to the United States
Artists from Chicago
American contemporary painters
1955 births
Living people
20th-century American male artists